Sonar Kella, also Shonar Kella, is a 1971 mystery novel written by  by Bengali writer and filmmaker Satyajit Ray.  In 1974, Ray directed a film adaption of the book, also named Sonar Kella, starring Soumitra Chatterjee, Santosh Dutta, Siddartha Chatterjee and Kushal Chakraborty. The movie was released in the United States as The Golden Fortress. It is the first film adaptation of Ray's famous sleuth Feluda and was followed by Joi Baba Felunath.

Plot

The film begins with a school-boy Mukul Dhar (Kushal Chakraborty), who is said to be able to remember events of his previous life, and soon receives media attention. Dr. Hemanga Hajra (Sailen Mukherjee), a parapsychologist, offers his help, believing it might help him in his own research. Mukul always remains sombre and paints peacocks, forts, camels and battlescenes at midnight; he mentions that he lived in the Golden Fortress (Sonar Kella) and that their house had many gems. Dr. Hajra decides to take Mukul on a trip to Rajasthan, famous for forts, historical importance and desert landscape. Two seasoned fraudsters, Amiyanath Burman and Mandar Bose, plan to kidnap Mukul to capture the treasure. Their first attempt at the kidnapping fails when they pick up another boy, also named Mukul (Santanu Bagchi), from the same neighborhood. Alarmed by this, Mukul's father engages Pradosh Chandra Mitter a.k.a. Feluda (Soumitra Chatterjee), a private investigator, to protect his son. Feluda leaves for Rajasthan along with his cousin Tapesh a.k.a Topshe (Siddartha Chatterjee), following Dr. Hajra. On their way, they meet and befriend Lalmohan Ganguly, a.k.a. Jatayu (Santosh Dutta), a popular thriller writer.

Meanwhile, Burman and Bose kidnap Mukul and push Dr. Hajra off a cliff to his presumed death at the Nahargarh Fort in Jaipur. Burman impersonates as Dr. Hajra and Bose impersonates as a globe-trotter. Dr. Hajra actually survived the fall and begins to pursue them. Feluda arrives in Jodhpur Circuit House and meets Burman, assuming him to be Dr. Hajra. Feluda begins to suspect Bose based on his clothes and his accent. Feluda even suspects "Dr. Hajra's" conduct as he appears lackadaisical in his research. Mukul keeps saying he is followed by a "bad man". Burman successfully hypnotizes Mukul, who says that the Golden Fortress is in Jaisalmer. Dr. Hajra reaches to the same conclusion by learning about the history of the Fort of Jaisalmer from a police inspector. Feluda learns that the Jaisalmer Fort is made of yellow limestone, giving it a golden glow. Bose lies to Feluda by saying that Burman/Dr. Hajra has already left with Mukul for Barmer, in order to lure Feluda on the wrong track. Feluda suspects foul play but cannot be sure. By chance, his eye falls upon the card of Dr Hajra; an idea flashes in his mind and he rushes to check the register of the circuit house and finds that it is signed as 'Hazra' not 'Hajra'. He is now sure about the man impersonating as Dr Hajra, and  leaves for Jaisalmer by car. Bose strands Feluda, Topshe, and Jatayu on the highway. Feluda takes a camel caravan to the nearest train station, from which he takes the next train to Jaisalmer. At night, in the train, Bose attacks and attempts to stab Feluda to death, who anticipated the attack and nearly defeats him; eventually, Bose falls out of the train and most probably dies after seeing the real Dr. Hajra in a separate compartment of the same train and assuming him to be a ghost. The trio arrive in Jaisalmer along with Dr. Hajra. They rush to the fort, where they find Burman searching for the treasure where Mukul recalled his home of previous life was. Feluda confronts and captures Burman, telling him that there never was any treasure. They find that Mukul is cured of his obsession of previous life, and they return to Kolkata.

Characters
 Pradosh Chandra Mitter a.k.a. Feluda
 Tapesh Ranjan Mitter a.k.a. Topshe
 Lalmohan Ganguly a.k.a. Jatayu
 Sidhu Jyatha
 Mukul Dhar 
 Mandar Bose
 Amiyanath Burman
 Dr. Hemanga Hajra
 Dibbhojuthi Paul
 Binay Mitra

Cast
 Soumitra Chatterjee as Feluda
 Siddartha Chatterjee as Topshe
 Santosh Dutta as Jatayu
 Kushal Chakraborty as Mukul Dhar
 Kamu Mukherjee as Mandar Bose
 Harindranath Chattopadhyay as Sidhu Jyatha
 Haradhan Banerjee as Binay Mitra
 Shailen Mukherjee as Dr. Hemanga Hajra
 Ajoy Banerjee as Amiyanath Burman a.k.a Bhavananda a.k.a The Fake Dr Hemanga Hazra.
 Bishnupada Rudrapaul as Dibbhojuthi Paul
 Santanu Bagchi as Mukul, another boy
 Bimal Chatterjee as the grandfather of the another Mukul
 Ashok Mukherjee as the Journalist

Crew
 Satyajit Ray - Director, Screenplay, Music Score (composer)
 Soumendu Roy - Cinematography
 Dulal Dutta - Editor
 Mangesh Deshai - Sound Mixing Engineer (Re recording)
 J.D Irani - Dubbing Sound Recordist
 Anil Talukdar - Guide Track Sound recordist
 Ashoke Bose - Production Designer
 Debayan Roy - Production Basic

Awards

 National Film Awards for Best Screenplay & Best Direction(1974)
 Best Film, Direction and Screenplay, Government of West Bengal, 1974
 Best Feature Film for Children and Young Adults, Tehran, 1975
 National Film Award for Best Cinematography (1974)
 National Film Award for Best Child Artist (1974)
 National Film Award for Best Feature Film in Bengali (1974)

See also
 Joi Baba Felunath (1979)

References

External links
 
 Sonar Kella (SatyajitRay.org)

Films directed by Satyajit Ray
Bengali-language Indian films
Indian detective films
1974 films
1971 novels
Feluda (series)
Novels by Satyajit Ray
Indian novels adapted into films
Films based on Indian novels
Novels set in India
Films set in India
Films set in Rajasthan
Indian children's films
Rajasthani culture
Films whose director won the Best Director National Film Award
Films whose cinematographer won the Best Cinematography National Film Award
Films shot in Rajasthan
Films with screenplays by Satyajit Ray
Films whose writer won the Best Original Screenplay National Film Award
Best Bengali Feature Film National Film Award winners
1970s Bengali-language films